Sandneshallen is an indoor multi-use arena in Sandved, Norway. It consists of an athletics track with four oval lanes and other relevant facilities, and a sports field to be used for handball, basketball and floorball in the middle. The building was a cooperation between the Norwegian state, Rogaland County Municipality and the municipalities Sandnes (where it is located), Stavanger and Randaberg. It opened on 1 June 2011, and was the second indoor athletics venue in Norway, after Ranheimhallen.

References

Athletics (track and field) venues in Norway
Sports venues in Sandnes
2011 establishments in Norway
Indoor track and field venues
Sports venues completed in 2011